Roberto Ortiz may refer to:

Roberto María Ortiz (1886–1942), President of Argentina from 1938 to 1942
Roberto Ortiz (baseball) (1915–1971), Cuban baseball player
Roberto Ortiz (umpire) (born 1984), Puerto Rican baseball umpire
Roberto Ortiz (boxer) (born 1985), Mexican boxer

See also
Robert Ortiz (disambiguation)